Viktoriya Tokonbayeva (born 17 December 1975) is a retired Kazakhstani sprinter who specialized in the 100 metres.

She won the bronze medal at the 1995 Asian Championships.

Her personal best time is 11.30 seconds, achieved in July 1995 in Almaty.

References

External links

1975 births
Living people
Kazakhstani female sprinters
Place of birth missing (living people)
20th-century Kazakhstani women
21st-century Kazakhstani women